The Hoklo people or Hokkien people are a Han Chinese subgroup who speak Hokkien, a Southern Min language, or trace their ancestry to Southeastern Fujian, China and known by various endonyms or other related terms such as Banlam (Minnan) people or Hokkien people. There are significant overseas populations in Taiwan, Malaysia, Singapore, Indonesia, Brunei and the Americas.

Etymology 

In Taiwan, there are three common ways to write Hoklo in Chinese characters, although none have been established as etymologically correct: 

   mistakenly used by outsiders to emphasize their native connection to Fujian province. It is not an accurate transliteration in terms from Hokkien itself although it may correspond to an actual usage in Hakka.
   emphasizes their purported long history originating from the area south of the Yellow River. This term does not exist in Hokkien. The transliteration is a phonologically inaccurate folk etymology, though the Mandarin pronunciation Héluò has gained currency through the propagation of the inaccurate transliteration. 
   emphasizes the modern pronunciation of the characters (without regard to the meaning of the Chinese characters); phonologically accurate.

In Hakka, Teochew, and Cantonese, Hoklo may be written as Hoglo and 學佬.

In Taiwan, the term Holo is also used to refer to the language (Taiwanese language) and those people who speak it.

Culture

Architecture 

Hoklo architecture is, for the most part, similar to any other traditional Chinese architectural styles. Hoklo shrines and temples have tilted sharp eaves just like the architecture of Han Chinese due to traditional beliefs. However, Hoklo shrines and temples do have special differences from the styles in other regions of China: the top roofs are high and slanted with exaggerated, finely-detailed decorative inlays of wood and porcelain.

The main halls of Hoklo temples are also a little different in that they are usually decorated with two dragons on the rooftop at the furthest left and right corners and with a miniature figure of a pagoda at the center of the rooftop. One such example of this is the Kaiyuan Temple in Fujian, China.

Language 

The Hoklo people speak the mainstream Hokkien (Minnan) dialect which is mutually intelligible to the Teochew dialect but to a small degree. Hokkien can be traced back to the Tang Dynasty, and it also has roots from earlier periods such as the Northern and Southern Dynasties and also a little influence from other dialects as well.

Hokkien has one of the most diverse phoneme inventories among Chinese varieties, with more consonants than Standard Mandarin or Standard Yue. Vowels are more-or-less similar to that of Standard Mandarin. Hokkien varieties retain many pronunciations that are no longer found in other Chinese varieties. These include the retention of the  initial, which is now  (Pinyin 'zh') in Mandarin (e.g. 'bamboo' 竹 is tik, but zhú in Mandarin), having disappeared before the 6th century in other Chinese varieties. Hokkien has 5 to 7 tones, or 7 to 9 tones according to traditional sense, depending on the variety. The Amoy dialect for example, has 7-8 tones.

Diaspora

Taiwan 

About 70% of the Taiwanese people descend from Hoklo immigrants who arrived to the island prior to the start of Japanese rule in 1895. They could be categorized as originating from Xiamen, Quanzhou and Zhangzhou based on their dialects and districts of origin. People from the former two areas (Quanzhou-speaking) were dominant in the north of the island and along the west coast, whereas people from the latter two areas (Zhangzhou-speaking) were dominant in the south and perhaps the central plains as well.

Southeast Asia 
The Hoklo or Hokkien-lang (as they are known in Southeast Asia) are the largest dialect group among the Chinese diaspora communities in Malaysia, Singapore, the Philippines and the southern part of Thailand. These communities contain the highest concentrations of Hoklo or Hokkien-lang in the region. The various Hokkien/Minnan dialects are still widely spoken in these countries, but the daily use of them is slowly decreasing in favor of Mandarin Chinese, English, and local languages.

The Hoklo or Hokkien-lang also make up the largest ethnic group among Chinese Indonesians.

In the Philippines, the Hoklo or Hokkien-lang form the majority of the Chinese people in the country. The native Hokkien/Minnan dialect is still spoken there.

Hailufeng Hokkiens 
The Minnan speaking people in Haifeng and Lufeng are known as Hailufeng Hokkiens or Hailufeng Minnan, in a narrow scope, but are often mistaken by outsiders as Teochews in Hong Kong and Southeast Asia.

Chen Jiongming is a famous Hailufeng Hokkien who served as the governor of the Guangdong and Guangxi provinces previously.

United States 

After the 1960s, many Hokkiens from Taiwan began immigrating to the United States and Canada.

Hong Kong

Notable Hoklo people

See also 
 Hokkien honorifics
 Demographics of Taiwan
 Taiwanese people
 Teochew people

Notes

References

Bibliography 

Ethnic groups in Fujian
Ethnic groups in Taiwan